The Syrian National Symphony Orchestra is the national symphony orchestra of Syria. Its home venue is the Damascus Opera House, and many of its members have been educated at the Higher Institute for Music in the same cultural complex on Umayyad Square in a central location of Damascus.

History and musical activities 
The orchestra was founded by Iraqi-born composer and musician Solhi al-Wadi, its first conductor as well as the director of the Higher Institute for Music in Damascus, and gave its first public concert in 1993. On 4 September 1998, the orchestra performed in the United States, at the Orange County Performing Arts Center. The orchestra has its permanent home in the Damascus Opera House, and its principal conductor is the Syrian maestro Missak Baghboudarian, who received his academic training in Italy.

The orchestra's repertoire includes both Western classical music, as well as works by contemporary Syrian composers, including Maias Alyamani, Malek Jandali, or Zaid Jabri. - A charity concert by the orchestra on 3 February 2009 raised $110,000 for an UNRWA campaign for the children of Gaza.

Apart from the symphony orchestra, there was also is a Syrian National Orchestra for Arabic Music performing classical Arabic music, with musicians like Syrian oud virtuoso Issam Rafea, trained in this musical tradition of the Middle East.

Due to the ongoing civil war in Syria, many musicians have left the country for exile in Europe, the US or other countries, but still, the musical audience in Damascus, as well as the authorities and remaining musicians, continue with concerts and other musical activities. In July 2020, the SNSO participated with an online performance from Damascus of Beethoven's Eroica symphony in a series of friendship concerts, where Italian conductor Riccardo Muti conducted his Luigi Cherubini Youth Orchestra with Syrian guest musicians in Ravenna, Italy.

References

Musical groups established in 1993
Syrian culture
Syrian orchestras
Syrian musicians
Music organizations based in Syria